Zhang Yuning (born 5 January 1997) is a Chinese professional footballer who currently plays as a forward for Chinese Super League club Beijing Guoan.

Club career
Zhang Yuning started his football career when he joined Hangzhou Greentown's youth academy in 2008. Due to several good performances for the academy, he was called up to the Chinese national under-17 team for the 2012 AFC U-16 Championship and scored two goals in three matches during the tournament. During the 2015 season, he was promoted to the club's first team, making his debut and scoring his first goal for the club on 13 May 2015 in a 1–1 draw against Wuhan Hongxing in the 2015 Chinese FA Cup.

In July 2015, Zhang transferred to Eredivisie side Vitesse, signing a two-year contract. He made his debut for the club on 13 February 2016 in a 3–0 win against SC Heerenveen, coming on as a substitute for Valeri Qazaishvili in the 86th minute. On 6 March 2016, he scored his first goal for the club in a 2–1 win against Roda JC. He scored his second goal of the season on 8 May 2016 in a 2–2 draw against Twente. Zhang was given the number 9 shirt for the 2016-17 season; however, he mainly played as a back-up to Ricky van Wolfswinkel throughout the season. On 26 October 2016, he scored the opening goal in a 4-1 win against RKC Waalwijkin the second round of the 2016-17 KNVB Cup. He scored his only league goal of the season on 3 December 2016 in a 3–1 home win against PEC Zwolle. On 31 March 2017, Zhang extended his contract with the club until 30 June 2018. He was an unused substitute as Vitesse won 2–0 against AZ Alkmaar in the 2017 KNVB Cup Final on 30 April 2017.

In July 2017, Zhang transferred to Premier League side West Bromwich Albion on a three-year contract for an undisclosed fee and was immediately loaned to Bundesliga side Werder Bremen for two years. He failed to establish himself with the first team and appeared on the bench just twice during the 2017-18 season. He was an unused substitute in a home match against Borussia Dortmund on 29 April 2018 and an away match against Mainz 05 on 12 May 2018. His loan spell was subsequently cut short in June 2018.

On 22 June 2018, Zhang was loaned out to Eredivisie side ADO Den Haag  for the 2018-19 season. He suffered a ligament tear on his right ankle on 24 August 2018 when he represented the Chinese under-23 national team during the 2018 Asian Games, ruling him out for three months. He made his debut for the club on 24 November 2018 in a 3–2 away win against PEC Zwolle. After playing six league matches for the club without scoring, his loan spell was cut short for the second time on 22 February 2019.

On 24 February 2019, Zhang transferred to Chinese Super League side Beijing Guoan. On 1 March 2019, he made his debut for the club in a 1–0 away win against Wuhan Zall. He scored his first goal for the club on 9 March 2019 in a 4–0 away win against Chongqing Lifan.

International career
Zhang made his debut for the Chinese national team on 3 June 2016 in a 4–2 win against Trinidad and Tobago, scoring twice and assisting a goal.

Personal life
Zhang comes from a devout Christian family and has stated that Kaká is his footballing role model.

Career statistics

Club
.

International

Scores and results list China's goal tally first, score column indicates score after each Zhang goal.

Honours
Vitesse
KNVB Cup: 2016–17.

References

External links

1997 births
Living people
Sportspeople from Wenzhou
Association football forwards
Chinese footballers
Footballers from Zhejiang
China international footballers
Footballers at the 2018 Asian Games
Asian Games competitors for China
Chinese Super League players
Zhejiang Professional F.C. players
Eredivisie players
SBV Vitesse players
West Bromwich Albion F.C. players
SV Werder Bremen players
ADO Den Haag players
Beijing Guoan F.C. players
Chinese expatriate footballers
Expatriate footballers in the Netherlands
Chinese expatriate sportspeople in the Netherlands
Expatriate footballers in Germany
Chinese expatriate sportspeople in Germany
Chinese Christians